Rudolf Johannes Dührkoop (1 August 1848, Hamburg – 3 April 1918, Hamburg) was a German portrait photographer; one of the leading early representatives of pictorialism.

Biography 
He was born to Christian Friederich Dührkoop, a carpenter, and his wife, Johanna Friederica Emile. After serving in the Franco-Prussian War, he returned home and married Maria Louise Caroline Matzen. They had two daughters, Hanna Maria Theresia and Julie Wilhelmine, who also became a photographer, under the name Minya Diez-Dührkoop. He was initially a railroad employee, then worked as a salesman. During this time, he developed an interest in photography, and spent several years learning how to do it on his own. He published his first professional article on the subject in 1882. That same year, he applied for and was issued a  photographer's license. Six months later, he opened his own studio.

From the very beginning, he worked as a portrait photographer, and was quite successful. His daughter, Julie (Minya), became his assistant in 1887, aged only fourteen, and he moved to a larger studio the following year. In 1890, he opened a second studio, in Altona.

He held his first exhibition at a professional society in 1898. His portraits showed casual poses, without props or backdrops, where the subjects' attention was not focused on the camera. They received harsh criticism from the jurors. Two years later, he participated in the Exposition Universelle in Paris, where his works were given more positive reviews. By then, he had begun taking some photographs outdoors. A grant from the Hamburg Chamber of Commerce enabled him to attend the Louisiana Purchase Exposition, and visit the studios of several notable photographers throughout the United States.

In 1905, he was elected a member of the Royal Photographic Society in London. The following year, he opened an even larger studio, occupying two floors, and made Minya his legal partner. This left him free to open a portrait workshop in Berlin in 1909. He continued to work there and hold exhibitions until his death, although interest in his style of photography slowly waned. After his death, Minya took over the studio and maintained it until her own death in 1929. He was interred in the Ohlsdorf Cemetery.

Selected portraits

References

Sources 
 Klaas Dierks: "Rudolph Dührkoop",' In: Portraits in Serie. Fotografien eines Jahrhunderts, exhibition catalog, Museum für Kunst und Gewerbe Hamburg, Kerber, 2010, pp.100–101 
 Fritz Kempe: "Rudolf Dührkoop", In: Vor der Camera. Zur Geschichte der Photographie in Hamburg. Hans Christians Verlag, Hamburg 1976, pp.82–89 
 E. O. Hoppé: "Rudolf Dührkoop", In: Photo-Era, The American Journal of Photography, Vol.22, 1909, pp.271-280 (Online)
 Fritz Matthies-Masuren: "Dührkoop und die moderne Bildnis-Photographie", In: Deutsche Kunst und Dekoration, Darmstadt 1908, pp.22ff (Online)

External links 

 
 Photographs by Dührkoop @ Digiporta (digital portrait archive)

1848 births
1918 deaths
German photographers
Portrait photographers
Royal Photographic Society members
Photographers from Hamburg